In Greek mythology, Alcaeus  or Alkaios (Ancient Greek: Ἀλκαῖος derived from alke "strength") was the name of a number of different people:
Alcaeus, was a Mycenaean prince. He was a son of Perseus and Andromeda and thus the brother of Perses, Heleus, Mestor, Sthenelus, Electryon, Cynurus, Gorgophone and Autochthe. Alcaeus was married either to Astydameia, the daughter of Pelops and Hippodamia, or Laonome, daughter of Guneus, or else Hipponome, daughter of Menoeceus, by whom he became the father of Amphitryon, Anaxo and Perimede.
Alcaeus, the original name of Heracles (according to Diodorus Siculus), which was given to him on account of his descent from Alcaeus, the son of Perseus mentioned above.
Alcaeus, a son of Heracles by a female slave of Iardanus, from whom the dynasty of the Heraclids in Lydia were believed to be descended. Diodorus Siculus writes that this son of Heracles is named "Cleolaus".
Alcaeus, a Cretan general of Rhadamanthus, according to Diodorus Siculus, who presented him with the island of Paros. The Bibliotheca relates that he was a son of Androgeus (the son of Minos and Pasiphaë) and brother of Sthenelus, and that when Heracles, on his expedition to fetch the girdle of Ares, which was in the possession of the queen of the Amazons, arrived at Paros, some of his companions were slain by the sons of Minos. Heracles, in his anger, slew all the descendants of Minos except Alcaeus and Sthenelus, whom he took with him, and to whom he afterwards gave the island of Thasus as their home.
Alcaeus, son of Margasus and Phyllis, a Carian ally of the Trojans in the Trojan War. He was killed by Meges.

Notes

References 

 Apollodorus, The Library with an English Translation by Sir James George Frazer, F.B.A., F.R.S. in 2 Volumes, Cambridge, MA, Harvard University Press; London, William Heinemann Ltd. 1921. ISBN 0-674-99135-4. Online version at the Perseus Digital Library. Greek text available from the same website.
Diodorus Siculus, The Library of History translated by Charles Henry Oldfather. Twelve volumes. Loeb Classical Library. Cambridge, Massachusetts: Harvard University Press; London: William Heinemann, Ltd. 1989. Vol. 3. Books 4.59–8. Online version at Bill Thayer's Web Site
 Diodorus Siculus, Bibliotheca Historica. Vol 1-2. Immanel Bekker. Ludwig Dindorf. Friedrich Vogel. in aedibus B. G. Teubneri. Leipzig. 1888–1890. Greek text available at the Perseus Digital Library.
 Herodotus, The Histories with an English translation by A. D. Godley. Cambridge. Harvard University Press. 1920. Online version at the Topos Text Project. Greek text available at Perseus Digital Library.
 Hesiod, Shield of Heracles from The Homeric Hymns and Homerica with an English Translation by Hugh G. Evelyn-White, Cambridge, MA.,Harvard University Press; London, William Heinemann Ltd. 1914. Online version at the Perseus Digital Library. Greek text available from the same website.
 Pausanias, Description of Greece with an English Translation by W.H.S. Jones, Litt.D., and H.A. Ormerod, M.A., in 4 Volumes. Cambridge, MA, Harvard University Press; London, William Heinemann Ltd. 1918. Online version at the Perseus Digital Library
 Pausanias, Graeciae Descriptio. 3 vols. Leipzig, Teubner. 1903. Greek text available at the Perseus Digital Library.
 Quintus Smyrnaeus, The Fall of Troy translated by Way. A. S. Loeb Classical Library Volume 19. London: William Heinemann, 1913. Online version at theio.com
 Quintus Smyrnaeus, The Fall of Troy. Arthur S. Way. London: William Heinemann; New York: G.P. Putnam's Sons. 1913. Greek text available at the Perseus Digital Library.

Princes in Greek mythology
Kings in Greek mythology
Heracleidae
People of the Trojan War
Mythology of Heracles
Mythology of Argolis
Cretan characters in Greek mythology